= Silicon Harbor =

Silicon Harbor may refer to any of three different high tech and innovation regions:

- Hong Kong
- Charleston, South Carolina
- Atlantic Canada
